Joy Neil Mitro Deb, (born 14 January 1979) is a Swedish songwriter and producer. He has worked with artists such as Fifth Harmony, JoJo, MiC Lowry and Akon.

Currently, Deb is signed to Northbound Music Publishing in Stockholm, where he is a member of the production team “The Family” together with Linnea Deb and Anton Hård af Segerstad. Earlier (2013–2016) the group was signed to BMG Publishing.

Joy studied at the well-known school ‘The Writers Academy of Sweden’.

Early life 
Deb was born to an Indian father and a Finnish mother.

Melodifestivalen 
Joy Deb has done several successful contribution in the annual Swedish song contest ‘Melodifestivalen’. He has contributed to the contest with 11 songs whereas two of them were the winnings songs. The first winning song was in 2013 with ‘You’ by Robin Stjernberg. The same year the song also broke a Swedish record for most played song during one day and it got nominated for a Swedish Grammy as ‘Song of the year’ 2014.

The second winning song was ‘Heroes’ performed by Måns Zelmerlöw in 2015. The song also won the Eurovision Song Contest 2015. It sold 5× Platinum in Sweden and Gold in Spain, Norway and Austria.

 In Melodifestivalen 2016 his production-team “The Family” managed to get 4 different contributions to the contest -performed by Lisa Ajax, Ace Wilder, Molly Pettersson and ISA. Thanks to these contributions, they were appointed as ‘Songwriter of the year’ in the contest. The contribution with Ace Wilder ‘Don’t worry’ later got featured in the trailer for “Bridget Jones’s Baby”.

In 2017, Joy co-wrote two of the competing songs in Melodifestivalen – ‘I Don't Give A’ by Lisa Ajax and ‘Statements’ by Loreen.

International releases 

Joy has also written and produced several international hits. He co-wrote the first record 'Top Down' on Fifth Harmony's 'Reflection' Album. Also, Joy and his current production team wrote and produced JoJo's comeback single 'Save My Soul'.

 In 2016, "Oh Lord" was released with the British vocal harmony boy band MiC LOWRY. The song was the group's debut single and it was written by Joy, Linnea Deb, Anton Hård af Segerstad, Augustine Grant and Phil Collins, as the song contains lyrics and music from Phil Collins' song "In the Air Tonight”.

Discography 
 Top Down by Fifth Harmony 
 Heroes by Måns Zelmerlöw
Winner of ESC 2015. Nr 1 in 22 Countries.

         3× Platinum in Sweden. Gold in Spain, Norway and Austria. 

 Busy Doin Nothin by Ace Wilder
Nr 1 on ‘the Swedish Singles chart’. Swedish Grammy nominee for song of the year in 2015.

     5× Platinum in Sweden. 

 Oh lord by MiC Lowry 
 Therapy by Kim Cesarion
 Save My Soul by JoJo
Jojo's comeback single.

The track reached No.3 on ‘the real-time Billboard + Twitter Trending 140’ chart. It also peaked position 33 on US Billboards ‘Pop Digital Songs’ chart. 

 You by Robin Stjernberg
In 2013 the song broke a Swedish record for most played song during one day. Swedish Grammy nominee for ‘Song of the year’ 2014

     3× Platinum in Sweden. 

 Don't worry by Ace Wilder
The song is featured in the trailer for ‘Bridget Jones’s baby’. 

 My heart wants me dead by Lisa Ajax
It peaked position no.10 on ‘the Swedish Single’ chart.

 Hunger by Molly Pettersson Hammar
It peaked position no.57 on ‘the Swedish Single’ chart.

 I will wait by ISA
It peaked position no. 35 on ‘the Swedish Single’ chart. 

 Free Somebody by Luna 
 Soldiers by Ulrik Munther
 Bring out the fire by Andreas Weise 
 #Fail by Oscar Zia
 Echo by Outtrigger 
 Paradise by The Rasmus
    Monsters by Saara Aalto

References 

1979 births
Living people
Eurovision Song Contest winners
Swedish songwriters
Swedish people of Finnish descent
Swedish people of Indian descent